This article details the fixtures and results of the Thailand national football team in 2013.

Record

Goalscorers

vs Finland
International friendly  (2013 King's Cup) — B Matches

Assistant referees:
 Thanom Borikut  (Thailand)
 Anuwat Feemuichang (Thailand)
Fourth official:
 Chaiya Mahapab  (Thailand)

vs North Korea
International friendly  (2013 King's Cup) — B Matches

vs Kuwait(1)
2015 AFC Asian Cup qualification

Assistant referees:
Toshiyuki Nagi  (Japan)
Satoshi Karakami (Japan)
Fourth official:
Tayeb Hassan  (Bangladesh)

vs Qatar
International friendly — not full A-match

vs Lebanon
2015 AFC Asian Cup qualification

Assistant referees:
 Jeong Hae-sang (South Korea)
 Yang Byoung-Eun (South Korea)
Fourth official:
 Kim Dae Yong (South Korea)

vs China
International friendly

Assistant referees:
Kang Do-Jun (South Korea)
Choi Min-Byoung (South Korea)
Fourth official:
Wang Zhe (China)

vs Bahrain
International friendly — not full A-match

Assistant referees:
Sumate Saiwaew (Thailand)
Nirut Ruengsrichat (Thailand)
Fourth official:
Mongkolchai Pechsri (Thailand)

vs Iran(1)
2015 AFC Asian Cup qualification

Assistant referees:
 Ramzan Saeed Al Naemi (Qatar)
 Juma Al Burshaid  (Qatar)
Fourth official:
 Khamis Mohamed Al-Kuwari (Qatar)

vs Iran(2)
2015 AFC Asian Cup qualification

Assistant referees:
 Matthew Cream (Australia)
 Hakan Anaz  (Australia)
Fourth official:
 Mohd Amirul Izwan (Malaysia)

vs Kuwait(2)
2015 AFC Asian Cup qualification

Assistant referees:
 Rafael Ilyasov (Uzbekistan)
 Mamur Saidkasimov (Uzbekistan)
Fourth official:
 Vladislav Tseytlin  (Uzbekistan)

References

External links
Fixtures and Results on FIFA.com
Thailand Matches on Elo Ratings

2013 in Thai football
2013 national football team results
Thailand national football team results